
Gmina Łagów is a rural gmina (administrative district) in Kielce County, Świętokrzyskie Voivodeship, in south-central Poland.

The gmina contains part of the protected area called Cisów-Orłowiny Landscape Park.

Villages
Gmina Łagów contains the villages and settlements of Czyżów, Duraczów, Gęsice, Łagów, Lechówek, Małacentów, Melonek, Nowa Zbelutka, Nowy Staw, Piotrów, Płucki, Ruda, Sadków, Sędek, Stara Zbelutka, Winna, Wiśniowa, Wola Łagowska, Zamkowa Wola and Złota Woda.

Neighbouring gminas
Gmina Łagów is bordered by the gminas of Baćkowice, Bieliny, Daleszyce, Iwaniska, Nowa Słupia, Raków and Waśniów.

References
Polish official population figures 2006

Lagow
Kielce County